This is a list of Italian football transfers for the 2011–12 season. Only moves from Serie A and Serie B are listed.

The Italian winter transfer window would open for 4 weeks from 3 January 2012 (Tuesday). Players without a club may join one, either during or in between transfer windows. International transfers outward were depends on the status of transfer windows of the country the player arrived.

Clubs may still use its two non-EU international signing quota in winter windows if they did not use the quota in summer, subject to the club had either released (on 1 July 2011), sold aboard or nominate players which had obtained an EU passport recently. Those transfers were marked yellow.

Winter transfer window

Out of window transfer

References
general
 
 
 
 
 
specific

2011–12
2011–12 in Italian football
Football transfers winter 2011–12